Baykara is a Turkish surname. Notable people with the surname include:

 Deniz Baykara (born 1984), Turkish footballer
 Sertan Baykara, German journalist

See also
 Baykara, Kayapınar, village in Turkey
 Demir and Baykara v Turkey

Turkish-language surnames